Ian Andrew Gillan is a Scottish-born Australian football coach. He has a UEFA Pro License and currently technical director Indonesian club PSIS Semarang in Liga 1.

Coaching career
Taking charge of Ilocos United of the Philippines Football League in 2017, his first time in charge of a fully professional team, Gillan brought in many young players for the upcoming season. By November that year, he had departed the club, with the Malaysian media dispersing rumors that he would be head coach of local side Sarawak for the 2018 season. Eventually, the Australian trainer signed a two-year contract to lead Sarawak on 2 December, doing his first training session with their squad two days later.

Managerial statistics

References 

Sarawak FA managers
Living people
Association football midfielders
Australian soccer coaches
Expatriate football managers in Malaysia
Australian expatriate soccer coaches
Australian soccer players
Australian people of Scottish descent
Expatriate football managers in the Philippines
Australian expatriate sportspeople in Malaysia
1965 births